WEC 1: Princes of Pain was a mixed martial arts event held on June 30, 2001, at the Tachi Palace Hotel & Casino in Lemoore, California. WEC 1's main event was a fight between Dan Severn and Travis Fulton.

Results

See also 
 World Extreme Cagefighting
 List of WEC champions
 List of WEC events
 2001 in World Extreme Cagefighting

External links
 WEC 1 Results at Sherdog.com

World Extreme Cagefighting events
2001 in mixed martial arts
Mixed martial arts in California
Sports in Lemoore, California
2001 in sports in California